The Eurodanceweb Award is an online competition dedicated to dance music, created in 2001 by an idea of a group of Italian and Maltese disc jockeys. Main purpose of this project is the promotion of dance songs from all over Europe and the Mediterranean Basin, with strong links to their national language and culture.

Every year, after monitoring the international record market, the editors of the website Eurodanceweb.com choose the most interesting dance track for each European country. The selected entries are then voted by a professional jury of disc jockeys, journalists, productors, radio speakers and webmasters of popular websites and music blogs.

The winner of this voting achieves the Eurodanceweb Award, a prestigious  recognition which has become an important promotional channel worldwide.

Since 2007 also the readers of the official website of this competition can choose their favourite song, by voting on an online poll.

In January 2015, after they announce 2014 winner Kate Ryan, Eurodanceweb Award become inactive and no announcements for future awards.

Winners

References

External links 
Official website

European music awards